Colonel John Harold Greenway Deighton, MC, OBE (5 April 1920 – 15 September 1999) was an English army officer and cricketer who played first-class cricket from 1947 to 1962.

Deighton was educated at Denstone College, where he played for the First XI from 1937 to 1939, also appearing in the annual schools match at Lord's for The Rest against Lord's Schools in 1938 and 1939. He appeared in 35 first-class matches as a right-handed batsman who bowled right-arm fast-medium pace. He scored 994 runs with a highest score of 79 and held 17 catches. He took 127 wickets with a best analysis of six for 50. He played a few games of county cricket for Lancashire from 1948 to 1950, but most of his first-class cricket was for Combined Services, which he represented in 20 matches from 1947 to 1962.

He served as an officer with the Northumberland Fusiliers in the Second World War, receiving the Military Cross for gallantry in Italy in 1944; he again served in the front line in the Korean War. His cricket was affected by the limited time he could spare from his army duties and by the shrapnel that remained in his arms and legs.

References

External links
 John Deighton at Cricinfo
 John Deighton at CricketArchive

1920 births
1999 deaths
Military personnel from Lancashire
Royal Northumberland Fusiliers officers
People educated at Denstone College
Recipients of the Military Cross
Members of the Order of the British Empire
British Army personnel of World War II
British Army personnel of the Korean War
English cricketers
Lancashire cricketers
Marylebone Cricket Club cricketers
Combined Services cricketers
Free Foresters cricketers
Northumberland cricketers
Sportspeople from Prestwich
People from Kingsclere